The 32nd People's Choice Awards, honoring the best in popular culture for 2005, were held on January 10, 2006 at the Shrine Auditorium in Los Angeles, California. They were hosted by Craig Ferguson and broadcast on CBS.

Awards
Winners are listed first, in bold. Other nominees are in alphabetical order.

References

External links
People's Choice.com

People's Choice Awards
2005 awards in the United States
2006 in Los Angeles
January 2006 events in the United States